Kandavara Brahmins are  Smartha Brahmins who originated from Kandavara in South Canara. They live in Manglore, Udupi, Bengaluru, Thirthahalli, Sringeri, Shimoga etc.

History 

The Name Kandavara is derived from Skandavara/Skandapura. Unlike other Brahmins who embraced Dwaita due to the efforts of Madhavacharya and Vadiraja Theertha, Kandavara Brahmins remained Bhasma Dharis or Smarthas following Advaita Philosophy. They are disciples of Sringeri Sharada Peetha and Balekudru Shreematha.

Language 

The Kandavara Brahmins speak Tulu in South Canara and Kannada in Malnad. In Kundapura they speak Kundagannada.

See also 

Kannada Brahmins
Balekudru Shreematha
Sringeri

References 

Kannada Brahmins